Marpissa is a genus of jumping spiders that was first described by Carl Ludwig Koch in 1846. The name is derived from Marpissa, an ancient Greek village.

Species
 it contains fifty-one species, found in South America, Asia, Europe, the United States, Cameroon, on the Polynesian Islands, and the Greater Antilles:

M. agricola (Peckham & Peckham, 1894) – Brazil
M. armifera Urquhart, 1892 – New Zealand
M. balcanica (Kratochvíl, 1932) – Croatia
M. bina (Hentz, 1846) – USA
M. bryantae (Jones, 1945) – USA
M. carinata Butt & Beg, 2000 – Pakistan
M. dayapurensis Majumder, 2004 – India
M. decorata Tikader, 1974 – India
M. dentoides Barnes, 1958 – USA
M. endenae Biswas & Biswas, 1992 – India
M. formosa (Banks, 1892) – USA
M. fornicis (Dyal, 1935) – Pakistan
M. gangasagarensis Majumder, 2005 – India
M. grata (Gertsch, 1936) – USA
M. hieroglyphica Taczanowski, 1878 – Peru
M. insignis Butt & Beg, 2000 – Pakistan
M. kalapani Tikader, 1977 – India (Andaman Is.)
M. kalighatensis Biswas & Biswas, 1992 – India
M. lakshmikantapurensis Majumder, 2004 – India
M. lineata (C. L. Koch, 1846) – USA
M. linzhiensis Hu, 2001 – China
M. longiuscula (Simon, 1871) – Ukraine
M. manipuriensis Biswas & Biswas, 2004 – India
M. mashibarai Baba, 2013 – Korea, Japan
M. milleri (Peckham & Peckham, 1894) – Russia (Far East), China, Korea, Japan
M. mirabilis Butt & Beg, 2000 – Pakistan
M. mizoramensis Biswas & Biswas, 2007 – India
M. muscosa (Clerck, 1757) (type) – Europe, Turkey, Caucasus, Russia (Europe to Central Asia), Japan
M. mystacina Taczanowski, 1878 – Peru
M. nitida Hu, 2001 – China
M. nivoyi (Lucas, 1846) – Europe, Turkey, Caucasus, Iran, Russia (Europe) to Central Asia
M. nutanae Biswas & Biswas, 1984 – India
M. obtusa Barnes, 1958 – USA
M. pauariensis Biswas & Roy, 2008 – India
M. pikei (Peckham & Peckham, 1888) – USA, Cuba
M. pomatia (Walckenaer, 1802) – Europe, Turkey, Caucasus, Russia (Europe to Far East), Central Asia, Afghanistan, China, Korea, Japan
M. prathamae Biswas & Biswas, 1984 – India
M. proszynskii Biswas & Begum, 1999 – Bangladesh
M. pulla (Karsch, 1879) – Russia (Far East), China, Taiwan, Korea, Japan
M. radiata (Grube, 1859) – Europe, Turkey, Caucasus, Russia (Europe to South Siberia), Kazakhstan
M. raimondi Taczanowski, 1878 – Peru
M. robusta (Banks, 1906) – USA
M. rubriceps Mello-Leitão, 1922 – Brazil
M. singhi Monga, Singh & Sadana, 1989 – India
M. soricina (Thorell, 1899) – Cameroon
M. sulcosa Barnes, 1958 – USA
M. tenebrosa Butt & Beg, 2000 – Pakistan
M. tigrina Tikader, 1965 – India
M. tikaderi Biswas, 1984 – India
M. yawatai Baba, 2013 – Japan
M. zaitzevi Mcheidze, 1997 – Georgia

References

External links
Photograph of M. muscosa
Photographs of M. muscosa and M. pomatia
 Photograph of M. nivoyi
 Picture of M. bina
 Awesome spiders: Photographs of the elongated M. pikei

Salticidae
Salticidae genera
Spiders of Africa
Spiders of Asia
Spiders of North America
Spiders of South America
Taxa named by Carl Ludwig Koch